Eryphanis is a genus of owl butterflies in the family Nymphalidae.

Species
polyxena species group
Eryphanis automedon (Cramer, [1775])
aesacus species group
Eryphanis aesacus (Herrich-Schäffer, 1850)
Eryphanis bubocula (Butler, 1872)
Eryphanis gerhardi (Weeks, 1902)
Eryphanis reevesii (Doubleday, [1849])
Eryphanis zolvizora (Hewitson, 1877)

References

Morphinae
Nymphalidae of South America
Nymphalidae genera
Taxa named by Jean Baptiste Boisduval